Sarah Doron (20 June 1922 – 3 November 2010) was an Israeli politician who served as a Minister without Portfolio from July 1983 until September 1984.

Biography
Born in Kaunas in Lithuania, Doron immigrated to Mandatory Palestine in 1933. She attended high school in Tel Aviv, and was later elected to the city's council, where she chaired the municipal education committee.

A chairwoman of Liberal Women's Organization, she was elected to the Knesset in 1977 on Likud's list. Re-elected in 1981, she was appointed Minister without Portfolio by Menachem Begin on 5 August 1981. She remained a cabinet member when Yitzhak Shamir formed a new government in October 1983. When she joined the Begin government in 1983, Doron was the first woman in the Israeli cabinet in the nine years since Shulamit Aloni resigned in 1974.

Although Doron retained her seat in the 1984 elections, she was left out of the national unity government cabinet. She was re-elected again in 1988, but lost her seat in the 1992 elections.

Doron died on 2 November 2010 at the age of 88.

References

External links
 

1922 births
Lithuanian Jews
Lithuanian emigrants to Mandatory Palestine
Israeli people of Lithuanian-Jewish descent
Government ministers of Israel
Women members of the Knesset
Likud politicians
Members of the 9th Knesset (1977–1981)
Members of the 10th Knesset (1981–1984)
Members of the 11th Knesset (1984–1988)
Members of the 12th Knesset (1988–1992)
20th-century Israeli women politicians
Women government ministers of Israel
2010 deaths
Burials at Yarkon Cemetery